Elliði Snær Viðarsson (born 15 November 1998) is an Icelandic handball player for VfL Gummersbach and the Icelandic national team.

He represented Iceland at the 2021 World Men's Handball Championship.

References

External links
VfL Gummersbach profile
EHF profile

1998 births
Living people
Elliði Snær Viðarsson
Expatriate handball players
Elliði Snær Viðarsson